The Freedom Bridge: South Sudan's first permanent bridge over the Nile  was constructed in  Juba South Sudan and officially open in MAY 19th  year  2022.

Overview
In 2012, Japan International Cooperation Agency (JICA) signed a grants agreement with the Republic of South Sudan. The grants amounted to 4.1 billion yen; approximately US$52 million. Some of the grants were used for the construction of a new bridge over the White Nile River to relieve traffic congestion in Juba and improve the transportation capacity and connectivity of South Sudan. The new proposed Freedom Bridge funded by (JICA) would be 560 meters long with sufficient width for both east and west bound traffic and a pedestrian sidewalk. The Japanese Ambassador to South Sudan said "the new bridge will serve as a reminder to the people of South Sudan to maintain peace and be free from violence." The project was put on hold at the end of 2013 due to what was effectively the outbreak of the South Sudanese civil war in the country.

On March 19, 2015, South Sudan President Salva Kiir ceremoniously broke ground in Juba on a Japanese-funded, $91-million project to build a new bridge across the River Nile. It is expected to be completed in 2018, and boost South Sudan's economy.

On December 26, 2016, The South Sudanese government called for the resumption of construction of the bridge, which would support the transport of supplies and the development of the area. Earlier in the year, Japanese aid workers evacuated the country due to a resumption of fighting in the country. Without the return of staff from the Japan International Cooperation Agency (JICA), which was building the bridge, there is no resumption of the construction in sight.

On June 14, 2017, JICA re-assured the Transitional Government of national Unity (TGoNU) of its commitment in the completion of the suspended projects, like the Japanese-funded constructions of Freedom Bridge along the Nile and the project for provision of clean water in Juba have been suspended until peace is restored and security improved in the country.
In november 2021 the Japanese Resident Engineer Omeda Norio told reporters that the Freedom Bridge will be opened on July 5th 2022.

in may 19, 2022 during the opening of the freedom bridge those involved were, The president Salva Kiir Mayardit, Vice president Riek Machar, AU infrastructure envoy Raila Amollo Odinga and as well as head of Japan International Cooperation Agency  AkihikoTanaka who made his first oversea visit since assuming office

References

External links 

Bridges in South Sudan